Walter Tenniel Evans (17 May 1926 – 10 June 2009) was a British actor and, latterly, clergyman.

Family
Walter Tenniel Evans was born in Nairobi, Kenya. His middle name derived from the illustrator Sir John Tenniel, a distant relation. His daughter, Serena Evans, is an actress, and his son, Matthew, is a television director.

Evans was a direct descendant of Isaac Evans, brother of George Eliot (born as Mary Ann Evans).

Career
Educated at Christ's Hospital, the University of St Andrews and the Royal Academy of Dramatic Art, Evans first became well known for his long-running role as Leading Seaman "Taffy" Goldstein (and other occasional characters) on The Navy Lark, a popular BBC comedy radio series (1959 - 1977), which starred Jon Pertwee, with Ronnie Barker, Richard Caldicot, Heather Chasen and Leslie Phillips. Pertwee became one of Evans's best friends – he encouraged Pertwee to audition for Doctor Who, although both were unaware that Pertwee was already being considered for the role; Pertwee subsequently helped Evans to get a role in the Doctor Who story "Carnival of Monsters".

Frequently cast as a policeman, a doctor or a priest, Evans appeared in many of the most popular and successful British TV series of the late 20th and early 21st centuries, as well as many one-off programmes, over a period of 44 years. His TV debut was in the series ITV Television Playhouse in 1960; shortly after this he played Jonathan Kail in Tess, the 1960 ITV adaptation of Thomas Hardy's Tess of the D'Urbervilles, which also featured Geraldine McEwan and Jeremy Brett.

Among Evans's most notable TV credits are The Forsyte Saga (1967), The Saint (1967), four appearances in The Avengers between 1961 and 1968, episode five of Undermind  in 1965, Softly Softly, (1966, 1969), Randall and Hopkirk (1969), A Family at War (1970), Paul Temple (1970, 1971), multiple appearances in Z-Cars between 1963 and 1972, a regular role in Big Breadwinner Hog (1969), The Liver Birds (1972), The Fall and Rise of Reginald Perrin (1976), Yes Minister (1980), Coronation Street (1980), Rumpole of the Bailey (1983), The Citadel (1983) and "The Dancing Men" (1984), an episode of the Granada series The Adventures of Sherlock Holmes that reunited him with Jeremy Brett.

In 1985 Evans was ordained as a non-stipendiary priest of the Church of England and retired from stage acting, although he continued to perform in TV programmes until shortly before his death. During 1985 he had a recurring role in the comedy Shine on Harvey Moon. In 1987 he had a recurring role in the children's science-fiction series Knights of God (1987), which is notable for the last appearance on screen by Patrick Troughton. Coincidentally, Evans then took over the role of Perce, the grandfather, originally played by Troughton, in the comedy series The Two of Us following Troughton's sudden death in March 1987.

Evans's other television credits from between the late 1980s and 2004 include Inspector Morse, Lovejoy, September Song, Peak Practice, The Bill, Pie in the Sky, Heartbeat, Hetty Wainthropp Investigates, Casualty and Dalziel and Pascoe. His final screen appearance was in an episode of the romantic comedy series William and Mary (2004), directed by his son Matthew, which also co-starred Martin Clunes.

Evans made few appearances in films. His most prominent parts were as a murderous teacher in Walk a Crooked Path (1969), and as a detective in the thriller 10 Rillington Place (1971), the film about the infamous British serial killer John Christie starring Richard Attenborough.

In the 1990s Evans was also featured in Focus on the Family's Radio Theatre programmes, playing Ebenezer Scrooge in A Christmas Carol (1996) and a supporting role as Bishop George Bell in Dietrich Bonhoeffer: The Cost of Freedom (1997).

Partial filmography
 Only Two Can Play (1962) – Kennedy (uncredited)
 The Wild and the Willing (1962) – Warden (uncredited)
 Walk a Crooked Path (1969) – John Hemming
 10 Rillington Place (1971) – Police: Det. Sergeant
 War and Peace (1972, TV Series) – Prince Bagration
 My Brother's Keeper (1975–1976, TV series) –  Sergeant Bluett
 Knots (1975) – Tenniel – The Director

References

External links

1926 births
2009 deaths
Alumni of the University of St Andrews
Alumni of RADA
British male film actors
British male radio actors
British male television actors
People educated at Christ's Hospital
People from Nairobi
Place of death missing